SGO48 (read S.G.O. Forty-Eight) was a Vietnamese idol girl group based in Saigon, officially known as Ho Chi Minh City, Vietnam. They were the seventh international sister group of AKB48, after Indonesia's JKT48, China's SNH48 (former),  Thailand's BNK48, Philippines's MNL48, China's AKB48 Team SH, and Taiwan's AKB48 Team TP, debuted on December 22, 2018, at Crescent Mall, District 7, Ho Chi Minh City. Originally consisted of 29 founding members, known as the first generation, the group was consisted of 20 members as of April 2021, thus becoming the Vietnamese girl group with the most members. The group officially disbanded on December 22, 2021, after their last activity.

History

2018–2019: formation, recruitment and first generation debut 
On June 21, 2018, AKS Co. announced the formation of SGO48, based in Ho Chi Minh City (Saigon), Vietnam, with the joint venture between CTCP Tập đoàn Yeah1 (Yeah1 Group) (YEG) and Geo Brain Corporation, and formed the YAG Entertainment company. After the recruitment announcement on August 3 by both the AKB48 and YAG Entertainment team, audition process for the group's first generation on August 10, 2018, consisted of three separate rounds: online registration, interview, and lastly, final round. A concept for a SGO48 theater was brought up to conversation during the first livestream meeting with Japanese investors. Within the first round, candidates had to apply online on the company's website by filling out personal information, with more than 8,000 applications sent and of whom 350 candidates were selected to advance to the interview round. The candidates then performed and answered questions from the judges on the interview round, where 120 candidates were chosen to proceed to the final round. They then had their own talent performance for the training and selection round, where the judges would proceed to select the final members to officially join the group. The label then announced the 29 official members for the first generation of SGO48 on November 17, 2018, followed by their first live performance with AKB48's Team 8 a day after in Hanoi, Vietnam, as part of the "Kizuna Ekiden 2018" event.

Following the withdrawal of member BunnyV on December 13, SGO48 officially debuted on December 22, 2018, through their Dream Performance concert at Crescent Mall Centre, Ho Chi Minh City, where the group performed a total of four Vietnamese-adapted AKB48 songs, including “Shonichi”, “Aitakatta”, “Shoujotachi Yo”, and “SGO48”. Over 1,500 fans attended the concert, exceeding expectations for the newly formed idol group. Shortly after, the group then had their first international performance at the 2019 Asia Festival, presented by SHANDA GAMES, in Bangkok, Thailand, on January 27, 2019.

2019–2020: line-up changes, first releases and Senbatsu Battle 
With member Yuumi graduating May 31, 2019, YAG Entertainment announced that SGO48 would release their first single on July 17, 2019, revealing the title to be “Heavy Rotation”. The accompanying music video was later premiered through their official YouTube channel on August 1, 2019, followed by several appearances on their native television programs and events to perform the song live, as well as the group's first reality program Pinker School. On August 19, member Kaycee was announced as the group's first captain at their Hanoi meeting. The group then joined their sister groups at the AKB48 Group Asia Festival in Shanghai on August 24, 2019, where they co-performed “Heavy Rotation”, “Namida Surprise!”, “Kokoro No Placard” in Japanese, “Ponytail to Shushu”, and “365 Nichi no Kamihikouki”. SGO48 then announced their second single to be "Koisuru Fortune Cookie" on December 7, 2019, at the group's Koisuru Xmas Party mini show, where their native label announced the upcoming plan to recruit the second generation for the group. An accompanying music video for the song was premiered during the event, and later released on December 12, 2019. Member Anna then attended the 70th Kōhaku Uta Gassen on December 31, 2019, becoming the first Vietnamese idol member to join the other 48 sister groups for performance.

Following the dismissal of member Sachi on May 24, 2020, as well as the graduation of member Elena and Celia two days later, YAG Ent. announced the premiere of Senbatsu Battle, the group's second reality program on June 8, 2020, focusing on the members' practice process to select the final sixteen members - known as the regular senbatsu line-up for their upcoming third single.

On 22 August 2020, Captain Kaycee told on Kenh14 that there would be an MV featuring 23 members. This is the first time for the first generation to appear fully as a way to thank fans for supporting them since debut. YAG later teased a poster for their MV, Shonichi (Ngày Đầu Tiên - The first day), which is a B-side from the first single, "Heavy Rotation". On 18 September 2020, the MV is released on SGO48's YouTube Channel.

2021: original song and disbandment 
On April 4, 2021, YAG Entertainment, at the handshake event of single  RIVER , announced the 7 members with the highest number of tickets: Anh Sang (750 tickets), Hikari (648 tickets), Mochi (641 tickets), Le Trang (536 tickets), Janie (507 tickets), Ashley (486 tickets) and Trung Duong (468 tickets), and these members will join the group's first original song, which will be released in May. YAG Entertainment also announced their next single to be released in August. The Senbatsu will comprise 7 members who have the largest number of pre-order singles, including first and second generation members. On December 5, 2021, it was announced they will disband after their 3rd anniversary on December 22, 2021, due to the COVID-19 pandemic.

Final members 
Originally debuted with a 29-member line up on December 22, 2018, the group is currently consisting of 20 first-generation members as of April 11, 2021. The first and current captain of the group is Kaycee, announced on August 19, 2019, at the SGO48 Party in Hanoi meeting.

Former members

Discography

Singles

Music videos

Filmography

TV shows

Films

Reality shows

Radio broadcast

Documentaries

References

External links 

AKB48 Group
Vietnamese idols
Culture in Ho Chi Minh City
2018 establishments in Vietnam
2021 disestablishments in Vietnam